HANE may refer to:

 Hereditary angioneurotic edema, an angioedema
 High-altitude nuclear explosion

See also
 Hane (disambiguation)